The 2018 World Junior Curling Championships was held from March 3 to 10 at Curl Aberdeen in Aberdeen, Scotland.

Men

Teams
Men's teams

Round-robin standings
Final Round Robin Standings

Round-robin results

Draw 1
Saturday, March 3, 14:00

Draw 2
Sunday, March 4, 9:00

Draw 3
Sunday, March 4, 19:00

Draw 4
Monday, March 5, 14:00

Draw 5
Tuesday, March 6, 9:00

Draw 6
Tuesday, March 6, 19:00

Draw 7
Wednesday, March 7, 14:00

Draw 8
Thursday, March 8, 9:00

Draw 9
Thursday, March 8, 19:00

Playoffs

Semifinal
Friday, March 9, 19:00

Bronze-medal game
Saturday, March 10, 14:00

Final
Saturday, March 10, 14:00

Women

Teams
Women's teams

Round-robin standings
Final round robin standings

Round-robin results

Draw 1
Saturday, March 3, 9:00

Draw 2
Saturday, March 3, 19:00

Draw 3
Sunday, March 4, 14:00

Draw 4
Monday, March 5, 9:00

Draw 5
Monday, March 5, 19:00

Draw 6
Tuesday, March 6, 14:00

Draw 7
Wednesday, March 7, 9:00

Draw 8
Wednesday, March 7, 19:00

Draw 9
Thursday, March 8, 14:00

Playoffs

Semifinal
Friday, March 9, 14:00

Bronze-medal game
Saturday, March 10, 09:00

Final
Saturday, March 10, 09:00

References

External links

World Junior Curling Championships
Sports competitions in Aberdeen
International curling competitions hosted by Scotland
World Junior Curling
World Junior Curling
World Junior Curling
World Junior Curling
21st century in Aberdeen